Fortaleza de Nossa Senhora dos Prazeres is a fort located in Paranaguá, Paraná in Brazil.

See also
Military history of Brazil

References

External links

Nossa Senhora
Buildings and structures in Paraná (state)
Portuguese colonial architecture in Brazil